Bateau Cove was a small fishing settlement in Bay St. George in the Canadian province of Newfoundland and Labrador. The population was 25 in 1911, 174 by 1951 and 112 in 1956.

See also
 List of ghost towns in Newfoundland and Labrador

Ghost towns in Newfoundland and Labrador